The 1906 Philadelphia Athletics season involved the A's finishing fourth in the American League with a record of 78 wins and 67 losses.

Preseason

1906 Philadelphia City Series

The Athletics played five of nine scheduled games against the Philadelphia Phillies for the local championship in the pre-season city series. The Athletics defeated the Phillies, 4 games to 1.

The A's moved to 18-15 against the Phillies after the 1906 series.

Regular season

Season standings

Record vs. opponents

Roster

Player stats

Batting

Starters by position 
Note: Pos = Position; G = Games played; AB = At bats; H = Hits; Avg. = Batting average; HR = Home runs; RBI = Runs batted in

Other batters 
Note: G = Games played; AB = At bats; H = Hits; Avg. = Batting average; HR = Home runs; RBI = Runs batted in

Pitching

Starting pitchers 
Note: G = Games pitched; IP = Innings pitched; W = Wins; L = Losses; ERA = Earned run average; SO = Strikeouts

Other pitchers 
Note: G = Games pitched; IP = Innings pitched; W = Wins; L = Losses; ERA = Earned run average; SO = Strikeouts

Relief pitchers 
Note: G = Games pitched; W = Wins; L = Losses; SV = Saves; ERA = Earned run average; SO = Strikeouts

Notes

References 
1906 Philadelphia Athletics team page at Baseball Reference
1906 Philadelphia Athletics team page at www.baseball-almanac.com

Oakland Athletics seasons
Philadelphia Athletics season
Oakland